DB-2073 is an alkylresorcinol antibiotic isolated from the broth culture of Pseudomonas sp B-9004.

References 

Alkylresorcinols
Antibiotics